William Bernard Gaughan (20 January 1892 – 1956) was an English professional footballer who played as an outside left in the Southern League for Cardiff City and the Football League for Newport County and Manchester City.

Personal life 
Gaughan served in the Welsh Regiment during the First World War and was commissioned as a second lieutenant in January 1918.

Career statistics

References 

Scottish Football League players
British Army personnel of World War I
English footballers
English Football League players
Southern Football League players
Sportspeople from Surrey
1892 births
1956 deaths
Association football outside forwards
Welch Regiment officers
Cardiff City F.C. players
Newport County A.F.C. players
Manchester City F.C. players
Footballers from Surrey
Military personnel from Surrey